In politics, a boss is a person who controls a faction or local branch of a political party. They do not necessarily hold public office themselves; most historical bosses did not, at least during the times of their greatest influence. Numerous officeholders in that unit are subordinate to the single boss in party affairs. Bosses may base their power on the support of numerous voters, usually organized voting blocs, and manage a coalition of these blocs and various other stakeholders. When the party wins, they typically control appointments in their unit, and have a voice at the higher levels. Reformers typically allege that political bosses are corrupt. This corruption is usually tied to patronage; the exchange of jobs, lucrative contracts and other political favors for votes, campaign contributions and sometimes outright bribes.

History
The appearance of bosses has been common since the Roman Republic, and remain fairly common or maybe widespread today. In Spanish America, Brazil, Spain, and Portugal political bosses called caciques hold power in many places, while in Italy they are often referred to as ras. Bosses were a major part of the political landscape during the 19th and early 20th centuries in the United States, such as the political machine of Tammany Hall, which controlled financing of campaigns and influence via owing of favors to arrange patronage public appointments.

In the Southern United States, charismatic populist politicians like Huey Long commanded large networks of supporters. Similar practices existed in the northern cities, particularly New York City, where Boss Tweed (arguably the most infamous political boss) wielded control over the powerful Democratic political machine. In Denver, Colorado, during the 1890s Jefferson Randolph "Soapy" Smith operated as the Republican party boss and political fixer.

Charles Brayton exercised great influence over the politics of turn of the 20th century Rhode Island. He exemplified rural bossism within the Republican Party. Chicago had numerous colorful bosses, such as Democrats Hinky Dink and Bathhouse John. Chicago's Republican counterparts included Big Bill Thompson, who became mayor in the 1920s. One of Chicago's most iconic figures was longtime mayor and chairman of the Cook County Democratic Committee Richard J. Daley, who had a major voice in state and national Democratic politics. With a few exceptions in the Southwest, such as Phoenix, most large cities of 100,000 or more in the early 20th century had machine organizations, and usually claimed one or more local bosses, most of which were Democrats. Some had a major impact and hold on state politics, such as E. H. Crump in Memphis, Tennessee. A few bosses had reputations as reformers, such as Frank Hague of Jersey City.

Political bosses exist today. Politico in 2019 described insurance executive George Norcross as New Jersey's "most powerful unelected official", with "nearly uncontested control of South Jersey's Democratic machine".
An October 2020 article in The Bulwark argued that Donald Trump's appeal to white working-class voters in the 2016 United States presidential election was driven by the same kind of paternalistic and localist mentality that was exploited by the Democratic political bosses of the early 20th century. An April 2022 The New York Times article portrayed him as a modern party boss during his post-presidency.

In popular culture

Boss Jim W. Gettys, portrayed by Ray Collins, is a secondary character in Citizen Kane and Charles Foster Kane's political rival for the post of Governor of New York.

The television series The Dukes of Hazzard (1979–1985) featured a character named Boss Hogg, played by Sorrell Booke.

Boss Tweed was portrayed by Philip Bosco in the 1986 TV movie Liberty, and by Jim Broadbent as a major supporting character in the 2002 film Gangs of New York. Tweed is portrayed as a defender of the rights of minorities and helper of those in need in Pete Hamill's 2003 novel Forever.

The HBO television series Boardwalk Empire (2010–2014) focuses on Enoch "Nucky" Thompson (based on the historical Enoch L. Johnson), a Republican Party boss and gangster who controls Atlantic City, New Jersey during the Prohibition period  (1920–1933).

Notable individuals

In the United States

 Marion Barry (1936–2014)
 Bob Brady (b. 1945)
 Boss Cox (1853–1916)
 Richard Croker (1843–1922)
 Richard J. Daley (1902–1976)
 Tom Dennison (1858–1934)
 Carmine DeSapio (1908–2004)
 Johnny Dougherty (b. 1960)
 Meade Esposito (1907–1993)
 M. Harvey Taylor (1876–1982)
 James A. Farley (1888–1976)
 Frank Hague (1876–1956)
 Boss Hesing (1823–1895)
 William J. Jefferson (b. 1947)
 Enoch L. Johnson (1883–1968)
 Huey Long (1893–1935)
 Joseph M. Margiotta (1927–2008)
 John J. McClure (1886–1965)
 Michael Cassius McDonald (1839 – 1907)
 Alexander McKenzie (politician) (1851–1922)
 Hugh McLaughlin (1827–1904)
 George Norcross (b. 1956)
 Daniel P. O'Connell (1885–1977) 
 Frank Rizzo (1920–1991)
 Alexander Robey Shepherd (1835–1902)
 John F. Street (b. 1943)
 Tom Pendergast (1873–1945)
 John S. Williams (1835–1887)
 Boss Tweed (1823–1878)
 William Scott Vare (1867–1934)

In the United Kingdom

 Archibald Salvidge (1863–1928)

See also

 Corporatocracy
 Political corruption
 Za'im system

References

Further reading
 H. F. Gosnell, Machine Politics (1937, repr. 1968);
 S. Lubell, The Future of American Politics (3d ed. 1965);
 E. C. Banfield and J. Q. Wilson, City Politics (1963, repr. 1966)

 
 
Political terminology
Political science terminology

es:Caudillo